Scoparia spelaea is a species of moth of the family Crambidae. It is found in Australia.

References

Moths described in 1884
Scorparia
Moths of Australia